In Greek mythology, Merope was a Queen of Corinth, and wife of King Polybus. In some accounts, she was called Periboea.

Mythology 
The royal couple adopted a baby found by shepherds and named him Oedipus.  To avoid the prediction of an oracle that he will kill his father and marry his mother, Oedipus goes in voluntary exile to Thebes. On his way, he has a quarrel with an old man and kills him, and for answering a riddle of the Sphinx at the entrance of Thebes gets to marry the queen dowager Jocasta. He fathers four children with Jocasta: Polynices, Eteocles, Antigone, and Ismene.  He eventually finds out that the old man whom he killed on his way to Thebes was his own biological father, King Laius, husband of Jocasta, and that he fulfilled the prophecy. She was also like the grandmother to Oedipus’ children.

Note

References 

 Apollodorus, The Library with an English Translation by Sir James George Frazer, F.B.A., F.R.S. in 2 Volumes, Cambridge, MA, Harvard University Press; London, William Heinemann Ltd. 1921. ISBN 0-674-99135-4. Online version at the Perseus Digital Library. Greek text available from the same website.
Parthenius, Love Romances translated by Sir Stephen Gaselee (1882-1943), S. Loeb Classical Library Volume 69. Cambridge, MA. Harvard University Press. 1916.  Online version at the Topos Text Project.
Parthenius, Erotici Scriptores Graeci, Vol. 1. Rudolf Hercher. in aedibus B. G. Teubneri. Leipzig. 1858. Greek text available at the Perseus Digital Library.
Sophocles, The Oedipus Tyrannus of Sophocles edited with introduction and notes by Sir Richard Jebb. Cambridge. Cambridge University Press. 1893. Online version at the Perseus Digital Library.
 Sophocles, Sophocles. Vol 1: Oedipus the king. Oedipus at Colonus. Antigone. With an English translation by F. Storr. The Loeb classical library, 20. Francis Storr. London; New York. William Heinemann Ltd.; The Macmillan Company. 1912. Greek text available at the Perseus Digital Library.

Queens in Greek mythology
Corinthian mythology